Jennings Reef is a reef, mostly submerged, extending between Avian Island and the Rocca Islands, off the south end of Adelaide Island, Antarctica. It was named by the UK Antarctic Place-Names Committee for Leading Seaman Ronald A.J. Jennings, the coxswain of the survey motorboat Quest, used by the Royal Navy Hydrographic Survey Unit which charted the feature in 1963.

References

Reefs of Adelaide Island